Crafton Hills College (CHC) is a public community college in Yucaipa, California. CHC is part of the California Community College system. It offers associate degrees and career and technical certificates. Since its opening in 1972, more than 200,000 people have attended Crafton Hills and the college now serves approximately 6,500 students each semester with day, evening, and online classes.

History

On September 11, 1972, Crafton Hills College (CHC) welcomed its first students as the State’s newest publicly supported community college. Much of the college is built on Serrano land that Ruben and Lester Finkelstein donated through their foundation The Finkelstein Foundations. The original donation included 167 acres of land in 1966 with 76 more acres in 1970 and finally donating 251 acres of additional land. As the newer of the two colleges in the San Bernardino Community College District (SBCCD), CHC provided added capacity to serve Yucaipa and other east valley communities with high quality two-year college programs for transfer to four-year colleges and certificate programs for those eyeing jobs in certain workforce areas. Since its opening, CHC has enrolled 182,049 students and awarded approximately 16,466 degrees and 13,854 certificates (as of spring 2021). Its current enrollment is over 5,790 full-time equivalent students (at the most recent accreditation visit in 2020). CHC was first accredited by the Accreditation Commission of Community and Junior Colleges (a division of the Western Association of Schools and Colleges) in 1975 and has remained fully accredited ever since. Crafton Hills College (CHC) is one of 114 colleges in the California Community College system, the largest college system of higher education in the world.

Academics
CHC offers more than 50 majors in the liberal arts and sciences, vocations, and technical studies, and currently serves about 4,500 students. Students can receive multidisciplinary degrees, including Fine Arts, Health Sciences, Liberal Studies - Teacher Preparation, and Social Science, and the Fire Science and Emergency Medical Services-Paramedics programs are some of the finest community college programs in the state, with CHC the primary trainer for paramedics in San Bernardino and Riverside counties. CHC also has the distinction of being the top community college in the Inland Empire when it comes to degree/certificate completion rates and course retention/success rates. 
Crafton Hills College is accredited by the Accrediting Commission for Community and Junior Colleges of the Western Association of Schools and Colleges, an institutional accrediting body recognized by the Council for Higher Education Accreditation and the U.S. Department of Education. In addition, our Basic Firefighter Academy is accredited by CAL FIRE and the Office of the State Fire Marshall (OSFM), the EMT certificate is accredited locally by Inland Counties Emergency Medical Agency (ICEMA), the Paramedic program is accredited by the Commission on Accreditation of Allied Health Education Programs (CAAHEP), the Radiologic Technology program is accredited by the Joint Review Commission on Education in Radiologic Technology (JRCERT), and the Respiratory Care program is accredited by the Commission on Accreditation for Respiratory Care (CoARC).

Student life 
College clubs change on a yearly basis. Crafton Hills publishes an annual art and literature magazine, The Sand Canyon Review. The College Honors Institute (CHI) provides graduates with priority admission and scholarship consideration at many public and private four-year institutions. Theater arts productions, art exhibits, social activities, interactive workshops, cultural events, and musical performances occur year-round.

Athletics 
Crafton Hills College has men's and women's swim teams that began in Spring 2018 and men's and women's water polo teams that began in Fall 2019. Crafton created a men's & women's cross-country team in 2022. The Crafton Hills Aquatics Center features a 50 meter by 25 yards Olympic Swimming Pool kept at 80 degrees year-round.

See also 
 :Category:Crafton Hills College people

References

External links 
Official website

California Community Colleges
Yucaipa, California
Universities and colleges in San Bernardino County, California
Schools accredited by the Western Association of Schools and Colleges
Educational institutions established in 1972
1972 establishments in California
E. Stewart Williams buildings
San Bernardino Community College District